During the 1991–92 English football season, Sheffield Wednesday F.C. competed in the Football League First Division, following promotion from the Second Division the previous season.

Season summary
Having guided Sheffield Wednesday to promotion to the First Division and League Cup glory the previous season, Ron Atkinson left Wednesday for Aston Villa (in somewhat controversial circumstances, having claimed that he was staying on at Wednesday before departing a week later). He was replaced by striker Trevor Francis, who juggled his playing responsibilities with his management role. Under Francis, Wednesday enjoyed a fabulous season, finishing third, behind Leeds United and Manchester United and ahead of bigger clubs like Liverpool and Arsenal; this gave Wednesday qualification to the UEFA Cup.

Despite their overall good form, Wednesday still found themselves on the receiving ends of the season's heaviest home (6–1 to Leeds) and away (7–1 to Arsenal) defeats. Wednesday also lost both of that season's derbies against arch-rivals Sheffield United, losing 1–3 at home and 2–0 at Bramall Lane.

Final league table

Results
Sheffield Wednesday's score comes first

Legend

Football League First Division

FA Cup

League Cup

Full Members Cup

Players

First-team squad
Squad at end of season

Transfers

In

Out

Transfers in:  £3,105,000
Transfers out:  £370,000
Total spending:  £2,735,000

References

Notes

Sheffield Wednesday F.C. seasons
Sheffield Wednesday